Kyle White (born 12 January 1970) is an Australian former professional rugby league footballer who played for the Canterbury-Bankstown Bulldogs, Western Suburbs Magpies and the Illawarra Steelers in the NSWRL and ARL competitions. White also played for Widnes and Workington Town in England.

Rugby league career
White, a forward, was a student at Patrician Brothers' College, Fairfield and earned Australian Schoolboys honours in 1987. From 1989 to 1991, White played first-grade for Canterbury as a second rower and amassed 24 premiership appearances. He captained Canterbury at Under 21s level.

White transferred to Western Suburbs in 1992 and made a switch to the front row, playing as a prop. Some of his first-grade games for Western Suburbs were with younger brother Josh, a five-eighth and halfback. During this period, White had a stint in England with Workington Town.
After finishing his Australian career with a season at Illawarra in 1996, White had another stint in England, where he captained Widnes for two seasons.

Personal life
In 2019, it was reported that White was homeless and had been found wandering around the town of Warwick in Queensland.

References

External links
Kyle White at Rugby League project

1970 births
Living people
Australian rugby league players
Canterbury-Bankstown Bulldogs players
Illawarra Steelers players
Rugby league players from New South Wales
Rugby league props
Rugby league second-rows
Western Suburbs Magpies players
Workington Town players
Widnes Vikings captains
Widnes Vikings players